The Guatemalan Highlands is an upland region in southern Guatemala, lying between the Sierra Madre de Chiapas to the south and the Petén lowlands to the north.

Description
The highlands are made up of a series of high valleys enclosed by mountains. The local name for the region is Altos, meaning "highlands", which includes the northern declivity of the Sierra Madre. The mean elevation is greatest in the west (Altos of Quezaltenango) and least in the east (Altos of Guatemala). A few of the streams of the Pacific slope actually rise in the highlands, and force a way through the Sierra Madre at the bottom of deep ravines. One large river, the Chixoy or Salinas River, escapes northwards towards the Gulf of Mexico. The relief of the mountainous country which lies north of the Highlands and drains into the Atlantic is varied by innumerable terraces, ridges and underfalls; but its general configuration is compared by E. Reclus with the appearance of "a stormy sea breaking into parallel billows". The parallel ranges extend east and west with a slight southerly curve towards their centres. A range called the Sierra de Chamá, which, however, changes its name frequently from place to place, strikes eastward towards Belize, and is connected by low hills with the Cockscomb Mountains; another similar range, the Sierra de Santa Cruz, continues east to Cape Cocoli between the Polochic and the Sarstoon; and a third, the Sierra de las Minas or, in its eastern portion, Sierra del Mico, stretches between the Polochic and the Motagua rivers. Between Honduras and Guatemala, the frontier is formed by the Sierra de Merendón.

In addition to the streams which break through to the Pacific, a number of larger streams which drain to the Gulf of Mexico or the Caribbean Sea have their sources in the highlands. It empties in the Gulf of Honduras, an arm of the Caribbean. A vast number of streams, among which are the Chixoy, Lacantún, and Ixcán, unite to form the Usumacinta River, which passes along the Mexican frontier, and flowing on through Chiapas and Tabasco, falls into the Bay of Campeche. The Grijalva and its tributaries the Cuilco and San Miguel rivers drain west into the Chiapas Depression, and from there into the Gulf of Mexico. Lake Atitlan is a land-locked basin encompassed with lofty mountains.

Population history
The highlands have a long occupational history, with many Maya archaeological sites that include Zaculeu, Kaminaljuyu, Iximché, Mixco Viejo, Q'umarkaj, San Mateo Ixtatán, Chitinamit and many more.

Climate
The Köppen Climate Classification subtype for this climate is "Aw". (Tropical Savanna Climate).

See also
Altiplano
Guiana Highlands
Mexican Plateau

External links
Map of Guatemala, including principal rivers

References

Geography of Guatemala
Geography of Mesoamerica
Highlands